The black-shouldered cicadabird or Papuan cicadabird (Edolisoma incertum) is a species of bird in the family Campephagidae.
It is found in New Guinea.
Its natural habitats are subtropical or tropical moist lowland forest and subtropical or tropical moist montane forest.

References

black-shouldered cicadabird
Birds of New Guinea
black-shouldered cicadabird
Taxonomy articles created by Polbot